Maïva Hamadouche (born 4 November 1989) is a French professional boxer and police officer who held the IBF female super-featherweight title from 2016 to November 2021. At regional level, she held the French female lightweight title in 2014 and the European female lightweight title in 2015. As of September 2020, she is ranked as the world's best active female junior-lightweight by The Ring and second BoxRec.

Life and career 
Hamadouche was born in Albi, in the Tarn department. She was raised by a single mother in a family of 6 children. With a baccalauréat economique et social   she first planned to study law but abandoned this idea because of family and economic difficulties. Also interested in the army and more precisely in demining, she was received in the contest of the National Active Non-Commissioned Officers School of Saint-Maixent. Not wishing to leave France to continue to devote herself to boxing, she finally decided, at age 19, to make a career in the police. So, in 2009, she joined the Rouen  police academy.

She worked for two years in Asnières-sur-Seine then joined in 2014 the Compagnie de sécurisation et d'intervention of Paris. In March 2018 she received the bronze honour medal for courage and devotion from the city of Paris for having rescued in June 2017 a young Mauritanian migrant, injured by a driver, by applying a tourniquet on his leg.

Sports career 
After practicing football, she started to train savate at the age of 14, and also practiced boxing afterwards. She became a professional in 2013. She trained in Saint-Juéry at the beginning, then in Clichy after moving to Paris, having Sot Mezaache as her coach.

She is seven-time vice-champion of France in savate and English boxing, eventually opting for the second discipline despite her debut in French boxing.

In March 2015, in Milan, she became European lightweight champion, while the title was vacant, beating t Italy's Anita Torti by throw of the towel in the 5th round then she retained his title in May in Clichy, winning on points in ten rounds against the same competitor.

In November 2016, Maïva Hamadouche won her first IBF World Super featherweight title, still vacant, winning by points in 10 rounds in Paris against the American Jennifer Salinas. She became the third Frenchwoman to win that title after Myriam Lamare and Anne-Sophie Mathis. She retained the title in January 2017 against  Milena Koleva, from Bulgaria, in May 2017 against Anahí Ester Sánchez, from Argentina, then in  2018 against the French Myriam Dellal. In 4 December 2018, Maïva Hamadouche kept her IBF world champion title, for the fifth time, against Brazil's Viviane Obenauf.

She has the nickname "El veneno" ("the poison" in Spanish). In 2016, her promoter was  Malamine Koné. Since September 2018 her promoter is Brahim Asloum

References

External links 
 

Living people
1989 births
French police officers
French women boxers
World super-featherweight boxing champions
Sportspeople from Albi
French savateurs
Boxers at the 2020 Summer Olympics
Olympic boxers of France
20th-century French women
21st-century French women